The Dr. John Walter Parker Sr. House is a historic house at 1405 South Alabama Street in Pine Bluff, Arkansas.  It is a single-story brick building, with a complex gabled roof line and a porch that curves from the front around to the left side.  Built in 1909–10, it is believed to be one of the first brick houses in the community to be built for, and owned by, an African American.  John Walker Parker, for whom it was built, was a dentist who opened his practice in Pine Bluff in 1905.

The house was listed on the National Register of Historic Places in 2003.  It was delisted in 2018.

See also
National Register of Historic Places listings in Jefferson County, Arkansas

References

Houses completed in 1909
Houses in Pine Bluff, Arkansas
Houses on the National Register of Historic Places in Arkansas
National Register of Historic Places in Pine Bluff, Arkansas
Queen Anne architecture in Arkansas
Former National Register of Historic Places in Arkansas